Mr. Anderson may refer to:

 Ken Anderson (wrestler), American professional wrestler, formerly known as "Mr. Anderson"
 Neo (The Matrix), main character in the film, referred to as "Mr. Anderson" by Agent Smith
 Mr. Anderson, a supporting character in Beavis and Butt-Head

See also
Anderson (surname)